Orange II may refer to:

Acid orange 7, also known as Orange II
Council of Orange (529), also known as Orange II
Orange II (boat), a sailboat

See also
Orange (disambiguation)